The Hon. Francis John Robert Child Villiers (11 October 1819 – 8 May 1862)
was a British Conservative Party politician.

Child Villiers was the fourth son of George Child Villiers, 5th Earl of Jersey, by his wife Lady Sarah Fane. He was elected as a Member of Parliament (MP) for the borough of Rochester in Kent at the 1852 general election
and resigned through appointment as Steward of the Chiltern Hundreds on 22 November 1855.

Villiers was appointed a Steward of the Jockey Club in 1853.
In 1855 he left the country, with £100,000 of betting debts unpaid.

References

External links 
 

1819 births
1862 deaths
Conservative Party (UK) MPs for English constituencies
UK MPs 1852–1857
Younger sons of earls